Fatehnagar is a suburb in Hyderabad, Telangana. There are many small scale industries in the area. It is located next to Begumpet Airport. It was named after Nawab Abul Fatah Khan the eldest son of Amir-e-Paigah H.E. Nawab Sultan-ul-Mulk Bahadur and grandson of the Vth Amir of Paigah, H.E. Nawab Sir Vicar-ul-Umara Bahadur.

Transport
There is a local train station of MMTS, Fateh Nagar Railway Station.Bus stand is even available

References

Neighbourhoods in Hyderabad, India